Ocybadistes flavovittata, the common dart or narrow-brand grass-dart, is a butterfly of the family Hesperiidae. It is found in Indonesia (Irian Jaya), Australia (New South Wales, Northern Territory, Queensland and Western Australia) and Papua New Guinea.

The wingspan is about 15 mm.

The larvae feed on various grasses.

Subspecies
Ocybadistes flavovittata flavovittata (New South Wales, Queensland)
Ocybadistes flavovittata vesta (Northern Territory, Queensland, Western Australia)

External links
Australian Faunal Directory
Australian Insects

Taractrocerini
Butterflies described in 1824